Big-headed rice rat may refer to either of two oryzomyine rodents:

Euryoryzomys legatus, Tarija oryzomys
Euryoryzomys russatus, russet oryzomys or russet rice rat

Animal common name disambiguation pages